Sergei Romanovich Bongart (1918–1985) was an American painter. Bongart is admired for his richly colored and emotionally expressive landscapes, still lifes and portraits. He was best known as a colorist, working in exaggerated color, using dynamic but carefully controlled color relationships and extolling the virtues of approaching painting as "color first, subject last".

Early life and education
Bongart was born in Kiev in Ukraine. He studied art in Kiev, Prague, Vienna and Munich, before emigrating to the United States in 1948. Bongart lived for six years in Memphis, Tennessee, the location of his sponsor.

Career
In 1954 Bongart moved to Los Angeles where he founded an art school. He taught a number of aspiring young painters who later became well-known, nationally collected American artists—among them: Peter Liashkov, Del Gish, Sunny Apinchapong, Ron Lukus, Rulon Hacking, Melinda Miles, Patricia LeGrande Bongart, Susan Greaves, James Dudley Slay, Don Sahli, Ted Pressett, George Phillips, and Ovanes Berberian, S.Burkett Kaiser

In 1969 he established an art school in Idaho.  He lived half the year in Santa Monica, California and the other half near Rexburg, Idaho.  Much of his art reflects the rustic settings which reminded him of his homeland.
A few weeks before his death Bongart got the last visit from one of his students. That happened in a Hospital near Geneva in Switzerland, where the hope was, to save his life with a cell therapy. The student was Guido Frick, a painter from Germany. He remembers his visit:” To see Sergei in this hospital bed was heartbreaking. He was half the man I met just a few months before at his last Idaho- workshop. He was so weak and fragile, he hardly could rise his arm to wave me to come in. Several pillows stabilized him, while halfway sitting in his bed. When I left, we both knew, this was the last time we have seen each other. On a stretcher he was brought back to Santa Monica and died there a few days later in a hospital”.

Bongart's work is featured in prominent museums, and has received many awards, including a 1982 Gold Medal from the National Cowboy Hall of Fame for his oil painting entitled "Spring Evening." In 1968, he was elected into the National Academy of Design as an Associate member.

There are three books written to date about Bongart:

References

External links 
 Sergei Bongart: Notes on Painting
 Jeffrey Morseburg Sergei Bongart: From Kiev to Santa Monica

1918 births
1985 deaths
20th-century American painters
American male painters
Artists from Idaho
Artists from Los Angeles
Soviet expatriates in Czechoslovakia
Soviet expatriates in Austria
Soviet expatriates in Germany
Soviet emigrants to the United States
20th-century American male artists